Catorhintha selector is a species of leaf-footed bug in the family Coreidae. It is found in the Caribbean Sea, Central America, North America, and South America.

References

External links

 

Coreini
Articles created by Qbugbot
Insects described in 1859